Liberal is an unincorporated community in Clay Township, Spencer County, in the U.S. state of Indiana.

History
A post office was established at Liberal in 1887, and remained in operation until it was discontinued in 1907.

Geography

References

Unincorporated communities in Spencer County, Indiana
Unincorporated communities in Indiana